Raisting station is a railway station in the municipality of Raisting, in Bavaria, Germany. It is located on the Mering–Weilheim line of Deutsche Bahn.

Services
 the following services stop at Raisting:

References

External links
 
 Raisting layout 
 

Railway stations in Bavaria
Buildings and structures in Weilheim-Schongau